The Tuscarawas County Courthouse is located at 125 East High Avenue in New Philadelphia, Ohio. The courthouse was constructed by Thomas Boyd in 1882 in the Classical Revival style. An expansion was added in 1990 to alleviate the needs of a growing population and blends in with the older structure. The courthouse was placed on the National Register on July 16, 1973. The copper dome was fixed in 2018 restoring the copper color.

References

External links

Official website
Ohio Supreme Court article

Buildings and structures in Tuscarawas County, Ohio
National Register of Historic Places in Tuscarawas County, Ohio
Courthouses on the National Register of Historic Places in Ohio
Government buildings completed in 1882
Neoclassical architecture in Ohio